The Al-Ahrar Bloc ( or Liberal Bloc) is an Iraqi Shia Islamist political coalition formed for the 2014 Iraqi parliamentary election. It is headed by Dia Najem Abdallah al-Asadi.

The mainly Shia movement having the support of religious leader Muqtada al-Sadr strongly opposed a third term form Prime Minister Nouri al-Maliki, a Shia himself, in forming an Iraqi government and said it would not partake in a government by the latter whose State of Law Coalition had won the biggest number of seats in the new parliament. Al-Ahrar states prominently in its party platform that it wants to fight corruption which it says is rampant in al-Maliki-run government.

History
The coalition is considered a Sadrist Movement, despite the announcement of its leader Muqtada al-Sadr of withdrawing from political life.

In the 2009 Governorate Elections, the Sadrist Movement had taken part under the name Independent Free Movement List winning 43 out of 440 seats.

During the 2010 Parliamentary Elections, the Sadrist Movement was part of the National Iraqi Alliance.

In 2014 Iraqi parliamentary elections, The Sadrists  formed Al Ahrar Bloc, their own political coalition for the elections. Headed by Dia al-Asadi, it strongly opposed a third term for Prime Minister al-Maliki and his large grouping State of Law Coalition.

2014 parliamentary elections
Al-Ahrar Bloc has won 34 seats in the 2014 Iraqi Parliament, making it the second political grouping in the Iraqi parliament. The seats are divided as follows:

) includes: Other allied forces - 6 seats

2018 parliamentary elections
In preparation for the 2018 parliamentary election, Sadr has withdrawn the bloc from parliament and urged its MPs not to stand in the May poll, in order to make way for his new list known as Alliance towards Reforms, with the main components being the Sadrist movement and the Iraqi Communist Party.

See also
Sadrist Movement
Independent Free Movement List

References

External links
Al-Ahrar Bloc official website

Islamic political parties in Iraq
Shia Islamic political parties
Political parties with year of establishment missing